C. (Carl) Allin Cornell (September 19, 1938 – December 14, 2007) was a civil engineer, a researcher, and a professor who made important contributions to reliability theory and earthquake engineering and, along with Dr. Luis Esteva, developed the field of Probabilistic Seismic Hazard Analysis in 1968.

Biography
Cornell was born in Mobridge, South Dakota in 1938. He received his A.B. in architecture in 1960 and M.S. and Ph.D. in civil engineering in 1961 and 1964 respectively, all at Stanford University. He held a professorship at the Massachusetts Institute of Technology from 1964 to 1983, and in 1983 became a Research Professor at Stanford University. He was awarded the Moisseiff Award (1977), two Norman Medals (1983, 2003), and the Freudenthal Medal (1988) from the American Society of Civil Engineers (ASCE). He also received the Harry Fielding Reid Medal of the Seismological Society of America (SSA) in 2001, and the Earthquake Engineering Research Institute (EERI) Housner Medal in 2003.  He was a Fellow of the American Geophysical Union (2002) and Member of the National Academy of Engineering (1981). His wife was Elisabeth Paté-Cornell, formerly chair of Stanford's Department of Management Science and Engineering, and one of his five children is Eric Allin Cornell Nobel Laureate in Physics.

He is best known for his 1968 seminal paper Engineering Seismic Risk Analysis that started the field of Probabilistic Seismic Hazard analysis (PSHA), his work in reliability especially on second-moment methods and reliability-based code calibration, and his development of the probabilistic framework for performance-based earthquake engineering that became the unifying equation of the Pacific Earthquake Engineering Research (PEER) Center. His 1971 book, Probability, Statistics, and Decision for Civil Engineers (coauthored with Jack Benjamin), exposed an entire generation of civil and structural engineering students to the field of probabilistic modeling and decision analysis, and remains a standard reference for students and researchers to this day.

As of 2011, the International Civil Engineering Risk and Reliability Association (CERRA) has renamed its quadrennial scientific recognition award as the C. Allin Cornell Award, in honor of its first recipient.

Students

See also
Probabilistic risk assessment
Seismic hazard
Seismic risk

References

External links
 Obituary from the Stanford University News Service
 Obituary from the EERI Newsletter

Members of the United States National Academy of Engineering
Massachusetts Institute of Technology faculty
Stanford University School of Engineering alumni
Stanford University School of Engineering faculty
1938 births
2007 deaths
Earthquake engineering
People from Mobridge, South Dakota
Fellows of the American Geophysical Union
People from Portola Valley, California